The 2000 Prokom Polish Open was a women's tennis tournament played on outdoor clay courts in Sopot, Poland that was part of the Tier III  category of the 2000 WTA Tour. It was the third edition of the Polish Open and took place from 17 July until 23 July 2000. Second-seeded Anke Huber won the singles title and earned $27,000 first-prize money.

Finals

Singles
 Anke Huber defeated  Gala León García, 7–6(7–4), 6–3
It was Huber's 2nd singles title of the year and the 12th of her career.

Doubles

 Virginia Ruano Pascual /  Paola Suárez defeated  Åsa Carlsson /  Rita Grande, 7–5, 6–1

References

External links
 ITF tournament edition details
 Tournament draws

2000 WTA Tour
2000 in Polish tennis
Orange Warsaw Open
July 2000 sports events in Europe